The House of Daskaloski family, or House of Daskalovci is a house in the village of Vevčani, Vevčani Municipality, Macedonia. The house belongs to the Daskaloski family and the building is registered as a Cultural Heritage of Macedonia.

History 
The house was built in 1910. It belonged to two brothers from the old Daskalovci family who were tailors, making high-quality traditional folk costumes. Their father and other brothers were internationally known masons.

Architecture 
The building is modest in size. The first (ground) floor is made of stone, leveled with wooden sashes in dry masonry. There is brick arched decoration above the shuttered windows. The costume workshop and the sales shop were on the ground floor. The second floor is built of solid brick and has wooden windows also arched with solid brick. On this floor were the living rooms. The mezzanine and roof construction is made of chestnut beams. The roof is multi-pitched with tiles placed on a canvas of boards. The staircase that connects the ground floor and the first floor is also made of chestnut wood, and all the internal doors are made of chestnut. On the floor there is a centrally located closed porch, bay window sticking out on wooden beams with decoration specifically for this village, called Vevčanski kučinja (lit. Vevčani dogs). The wooden roof construction beams, which form the eaves with wooden planks, are also decorated with such decorations.

See also
 House of Kostojčinoski family - a cultural heritage site
 House of Duckinoski family - a cultural heritage site
 House of Korunoski family - a cultural heritage site
 House of Ḱitanoski family - a cultural heritage site
 House of Pešinoski family - a cultural heritage site
 House of Pluškoski family - a cultural heritage site
 House of Kalajdžieski family - a cultural heritage site
 House of Gogoski family - a cultural heritage site
 House of Poposki family - a cultural heritage site
 Kostojčinoski fulling mill and gristmill - a cultural heritage site

References

Houses in Vevčani
Cultural heritage of North Macedonia
Houses completed in 1910